O.T. Sarada Krishnan was an Indian politician who served as Member of Kerala Legislative Assembly from Kozhikode - 1 constituency from 1960 to 1964.

Personal life 
She was born on 22 February 1905 and died on 14 April 1973.

References 

Kerala MLAs 1960–1964
1905 births
1973 deaths